

Gmina Paczków is an urban-rural gmina (administrative district) in Nysa County, Opole Voivodeship, in south-western Poland, on the Czech border.

Villages
Apart from the town of Paczków, Gmina Paczków contains the villages and settlements of Dziewiętlice, Frydrychów, Gościce, Kamienica, Kozielno, Lisie Kąty, Ścibórz, Stary Paczków, Trzeboszowice, Ujeździec, Unikowice and Wilamowa.

Neighbouring gminas
Gmina Paczków is bordered by the gminas of Kamieniec Ząbkowicki, Otmuchów, Ziębice and Złoty Stok. It also borders the Czech Republic.

Twin towns – sister cities

Gmina Paczków is twinned with:
 Einbeck, Germany
 Uzès, France

References

Paczkow
Nysa County